Amorica (stylized as amorica.) is the third studio album by American rock band The Black Crowes. Spawned from the band's unreleased, incompleted, scrapped Tall album, Amorica was released November 1, 1994, on American Recordings and reissued in the UK in 1998 with two bonus tracks. Amorica reached gold status in the United States, shipping 500,000 copies.

The record cover notably featured a close-up photo of the pelvic region of a woman wearing a United States flag thong with pubic hair showing at the top of the thong. The cover photo was taken from the cover of the July 1976 issue of Hustler magazine. The album with this cover was subsequently banned from chain stores like Walmart and Kmart, resulting in the cover being censored with a solid black background, displaying only the thong.

Other songs recorded during the Amorica sessions were "Feathers", "Tied Up and Swallowed" and "Chevrolet" (a Taj Mahal cover). These tracks were later released as B-sides, bonus tracks or on compilation albums.

Reception

"The Crowes haven't ceased their cocky pillaging of the universal jukebox – echoes of the Stones and Led Zep abound," wrote Rolling Stone Paul Evans, who awarded the album three and a half stars. "But in joining the mix with offbeat kicks (Latino rhythms, wah-wah guitar, strange vocal treatments), they sound remarkably fresh."

In July 2014, Guitar World chose Amorica as one of "50 Iconic Albums That Defined 1994".

Track listing

Personnel
The Black Crowes

Chris Robinson – vocals, harmonica
Rich Robinson – guitar
Marc Ford – guitar
Johnny Colt – bass guitar
Steve Gorman – drums
Eddie Harsch – keyboards

Additional personnel

 Jimmy Ashhurst – mandolin
 Eric Bobo – percussion
 Bruce Kaphan – pedal steel guitar
 Andy Sturmer – "assorted musical gifts"

Production
 Pete Angelus – personal manager
 The Black Crowes – producer
 Bob Ludwig – mastering
 Jack Joseph Puig – producer, engineer, mixer
 Jeff Sheehan – assistant engineer

Charts

References

External links

 In-depth article on Amorica

1994 albums
American Recordings (record label) albums
The Black Crowes albums
Obscenity controversies in music